Wang Chang (born 7 May 2001) is a Chinese badminton player. Born in Ningbo, Zhejiang, Wang who trained in Ningbo training centre, entered the provincial team in 2015, and in the national team in 2017. After being selected to join the national team, he started his partnership with Di Zijian in the men's doubles discipline. He made a debut in the international tournament at the 2017 Badminton Asia Junior Championships, and claimed the gold medal in the boys' doubles event. He also participated at the 2017 World Junior Championships where he helped the team to take the Suhandinata Cup, and he also won the silver medal in the boys' doubles event. In 2018, he won the boys' doubles and mixed team titles at the Asia and World Junior Championships.

Career

2022 
Starting from 2022, Wang started a new partnership with Liang Weikeng and advanced to the final of the 2022 Indonesia Masters from the qualifying rounds. They lost 10–21, 17–21 to home favorites Fajar Alfian and Muhammad Rian Ardianto in the final. 

Later that year, they won the 2022 Japan Open, defeating Kim Astrup and Anders Skaarup Rasmussen in the final.

Achievements

World Junior Championships 
Boys' doubles

Asian Junior Championships 
Boys' doubles

BWF World Tour (3 titles, 3 runners-up) 
The BWF World Tour, which was announced on 19 March 2017 and implemented in 2018, is a series of elite badminton tournaments sanctioned by the Badminton World Federation (BWF). The BWF World Tours are divided into levels of World Tour Finals, Super 1000, Super 750, Super 500, Super 300, and the BWF Tour Super 100.

Men's doubles

References

External links 
 

2001 births
Living people
Sportspeople from Ningbo
Badminton players from Zhejiang
Chinese male badminton players